Night Song is an album by the saxophonist Arthur Blythe, released via Clarity Recordings in 1997.

Reception

In his review for AllMusic, Scott Yanow stated: "This is a particularly intriguing and enjoyable release ... Whether it be hints at New Orleans parade rhythms, Afro-Cuban jazz, older styles of jazz, or freer explorations, this is a fascinating set that is well worth several listens". In JazzTimes, Miles Jordan wrote: "This challenging CD finds Blythe doing most of the soloing with Stewart’s ebullient tuba primarily functioning as a walking bass. ... On the tunes that feature the percussionists-all playing hand drums-his marimbas definitely imbue them with a 'world music' feeling".

Track listing 
All compositions by Arthur Blythe except where noted
 "Night Song (Cancion de La Noche)" (Arthur Blythe, Gust Tsilias) – 5:44
 "Sorrows of Sonny Liston" (Tsilias) – 3:58
 "Down San Diego Way" – 3:43
 "It's Hungry/Fulfillment" (Blythe, Chico Freeman, Bob Stewart, Arto Tuncboyaciyan) – 7:43
 "Ransom" (Blythe, Tuncboyaciyan) – 4:04
 "Cause of It All" (Blythe, Stewart) – 5:02
 "We See" (Thelonious Monk) – 5:05
 "Blood Count" (Billy Strayhorn) – 6:18
 "Slanderous" – 3:57
 "Contemplation" – 5:43
 "Hardly" – 5:24
 "Night Song (Cancion de La Noche) (Reprise)" (Blythe, Tsilias) – 2:59

Personnel 
Arthur Blythe – alto saxophone
Chico Freeman – bass clarinet, percussion
Bob Stewart – tuba
Gust Tsillis – marimba, vibraphone
Arto Tunçboyacıyan, David Frazier, Josh Jones – percussion

References 

Arthur Blythe albums
1997 albums